Twardorzeczka  is a village in the administrative district of Gmina Lipowa, within Żywiec County, Silesian Voivodeship, in southern Poland.

It lies in Żywiec Basin alongside a Twardorzeczka stream flowing out from Silesian Beskids. There are two Tilia trees registered as natural monuments in the village. The village began as a hamlet of Radziechowy, where it belonged to until its separation in 1948. The village has a population of 1,204.

Monika Brodka, a Polish singer, grew up in the village.

References

Twardorzeczka